The Estadio de Ebibeyin is the home stadium of Akonangui FC in Ebibeyin, Equatorial Guinea.

In October 2014, the stadium hosted the Copa de la Primera Dama final.

In November 2014, it was announced the stadium would be a venue of the 2015 Africa Cup of Nations.

References 

Akonangui FC
Football venues in Equatorial Guinea
2015 Africa Cup of Nations
Ebibeyin